New Moon (Italian: Luna nuova) is a 1925 Italian silent film directed by Armando Fizzarotti and Mario Volpe.

Plot summary

Cast
 Pietro Campanella
 Ubaldo Maria Del Colle
 Miguel Di Giacomo
 Enzo Fabiano
 Vittoria Gey

References

Bibliography
 Aldo Bernardini & Vittorio Martinelli. Il cinema muto italiano, Volume 15. Nuova ERI, 1996.

External links
 

1925 films
1920s Italian-language films
Films directed by Armando Fizzarotti
Italian silent feature films
Films directed by Mario Volpe
Italian black-and-white films